Maurice Fatio (1897–1943) was a Swiss-born American architect.

Biography
Maurice Fatio was born in Geneva, Switzerland on March 18, 1897.

He graduated from the Polytechnical School at the University of Zurich and studied under Swiss architect Karl Moser.

In 1920, he came to New York City, where he first worked for society architect Harrie T. Lindeberg. He soon branched out on his own in partnership with William A. Treanor who was twenty years his senior. In May 1923, the 26-year-old Fatio was voted the most popular architect in New York.

He moved to Palm Beach, Florida in 1925 and opened an office there In Palm Beach, he began designing harmonious Mediterranean-style houses and eventually branched out into everything from Georgian to contemporary. In 1929, he married Eleanor Chase (1901-1944), a prominent Palm Beach society girl and novelist, in New York City.

Fatio had two children with Chase, Alexandra (1932-2015) and Maurice Pierre "Petey"(1930-1961). Maurice Fatio died on December 2, 1943 of lung cancer at a Chicago hospital. His wife died the next year.

James H. Clark bought the 40,000 square foot Il Palmetto in 1999. In December 2010 Casa Alva sold for $27.5 M.

Notable buildings
 Residence of David Rockefeller. 146 East 65th Street, New York City. 1924.
 Buenos Recuerdos . Palm Beach. 1927. Henry G. Barkhausen.
Ribault Inn Club, 1928 Fort George Island
 First National Bank of Palm Beach. 1928.
 Casa Della Porta. 195 Via Del Mar, Palm Beach. 1928. Mr. & Mrs. William J. McAneeny.
 Clubhouse - Indian Creek Country Club. Miami Beach. 1929.
 Casa Eleda. South Ocean Blvd., Palm Beach. 1929. Mortimer L. Schiff.
 Il Palmetto. 1520 South Ocean Blvd., Palm Beach. 1930. Joseph E. Widener.
 Eastover. 1100 South Ocean Boulevard, Manalapan, Florida. 1930. Mr. & Mrs. Harold S. Vanderbilt. On the U.S. National Register of Historic Places.
 Villa Today. Palm Beach. 1932. Mrs. Audrey Berdeau.
 Casa Alva. Manalapan, FL. 1935. Colonel & Mrs. Jacques Balsan.
 Brazilian Court Hotel. Palm Beach. 1936. South wing added by Fatio.
 Society of the Four Arts, Library. Palm Beach. 1936.
 Crespi Estate. Dallas, Texas. 1939. Pio & Florence Crespi.
 Four Winds. Palm Beach. Mr. & Mrs. Edward F. Hutton.
 Manana Point. Palm Beach. Mr. & Mrs Grover Loening.
 Villa Oheka. Palm Beach. Mr. & Mrs. Otto H. Kahn.
 Alva Base. Fisher Island, Miami Beach. Mr. & Mrs. William K. Vanderbilt, Jr.
 Dickinson House. 1240 Cocoanut Road, Boca Raton. On the U.S. National Register of Historic Places.

References
Notes

Bibliography

 Egan, Eric. Recent Florida Work by Treanor & Fatio, 1928-1937. Honor's thesis, Brown University, 1989.
 Fatio, Alexandra. Maurice Fatio: Architect.  A. Fatio, 1992. .
 Johnson, Shirley. Palm Beach Houses. New York: Rizzoli, 1991. .
 McIver, Stuart. Yesterday's Palm Beach. Miami: E. A. Seemann, 1976.
 Mockler, Kim. Maurice Fatio: Palm Beach Architect. New York: Acanthus Press, 2010. .
 Pryor, Hubert. Eleanor of Palm Beach. Philadelphia: Xlibris, 2002. .
 Reed, Henry Hope. The Golden City. New York: W. W. Norton, 1971. .
 Seebohm, Carolyn. Boca Rococo: How Addison Mizner Invented Florida's Gold Coast. New York: Clarkson Potter, 2001. .
 Treanor & Fatio. Recent Florida Work by Treanor & Fatio Architects. Palm Beach: Davies Publishing Co., 1932.
 Treanor & Fatio. Recent Florida Work by Treanor & Fatio Architects. Palm Beach: Davies Publishing Co., 1938. Second edition.

1897 births
1943 deaths
Architects from Geneva
American neoclassical architects
People from Palm Beach, Florida
University of Zurich alumni
Swiss emigrants to the United States
Architects from Florida
Mediterranean Revival architects